Callionymus persicus, the Persian dragonet, is a species of dragonet native to the western Indian Ocean where it occurs at depths of from .  This species grows to a length of  TL.

References 

P
Fish described in 1905